WKND is a radio station (1480 AM) licensed to Windsor, Connecticut, United States.

WKND may also refer to:

 WNEZ, a radio station (1230 AM) licensed to Manchester, Connecticut, United States, that previously used the callsign
 CJEC-FM, a radio station (91.9) licensed to Quebec City, Quebec, Canada, that uses "WKND" as a branding
 CJPX-FM, a radio station (99.5) licensed to Montreal, Quebec, Canada, that uses "WKND" as a branding
 WKND (album), a 2012 album by Ferry Corsten
 The Wknd, a media company in Kuala Lumpur, Malaysia

See also

 Weekend (disambiguation)